The following are the winners of the 25th annual (1998) Origins Award, presented at Origins 1999:

External links
 1998 Origins Awards Winners

1998 awards
1998 awards in the United States
Origins Award winners